Elshad Ahmadov (born on 25 May 1970) is a retired Azerbaijani footballer and former manager of Sabah.

Managerial career
On 15 May 2018, Ahmadov has appointed as a head coach of Sabah FK to replace Arif Asadov.

Honours

Manager
Azerbaijan First Division (1): 2017–18

References

External links
 Profile on www.national-football-teams.com

1970 births
Living people
Footballers from Baku
Soviet footballers
Azerbaijani footballers
Azerbaijan international footballers
Azerbaijani football managers
Azerbaijan Premier League players
Qarabağ FK players
Association football defenders